Trollet med den gula kepsen ("The Troll with the Yellow Cap") was the 1988 edition of Sveriges Radio's Christmas Calendar.

Plot
The story's main character is a troll wearing a yellow cap. This year, the programme sought up younger children as main audience.

References
 

1988 radio programme debuts
1988 radio programme endings
Sveriges Radio's Christmas Calendar